The 2003 SEAT Open was a women's tennis tournament played on indoor hard courts in Kockelscheuer, Luxembourg which was part of Tier III of the 2003 WTA Tour. It was the 8th edition of the tournament and was held from 20 October until 26 October 2003. First-seeded Kim Clijsters won the singles title, her third consecutive at the event and fourth in total, and earned $35,000 first-prize money.

Finals

Singles

 Kim Clijsters defeated  Chanda Rubin, 6–2, 7–5
 This was Clijsters' 8th singles title of the year and the 18th of her career.

Doubles

 Maria Sharapova /  Tamarine Tanasugarn defeated  Elena Tatarkova /  Marlene Weingärtner, 6–1, 6–4

References

External links
 ITF tournament edition details
 Tournament draws

SEAT Luxembourg Open
Luxembourg Open
2003 in Luxembourgian tennis